Marianne Meed Ward ( Meed; born January 4, 1966) is an American-born Canadian politician and former journalist who has served as the 29th and current mayor of Burlington since December 3, 2018.

Early life and education
Born in Greeley, Colorado, to a Canadian father and American mother, Meed Ward grew up in Kingston, Ontario and Toronto before moving to Ottawa where she earned a Bachelor of Journalism from Carleton University in 1989.

Career in media 
Meed Ward worked for Faith Today magazine from 1989, becoming managing editor in 1996. She resigned her position in February 1999 following a 'change in direction' at the magazine. She launched her own communications business, Meed Ward Media, providing writing, editorial, consulting or teaching services to a range of clients including Chatelaine, Vision TV, Ryerson University, Tyndale College, CHCH TV, Crossroads Communications, and the Toronto Sun where she served as a weekly columnist covering faith and ethics, and later covering the 905 area of the Greater Toronto Area. She stood down from the position to contest the 2010 election.

Career in politics 
Meed Ward first entered politics by running for Ward 1 councillor in the 2006 municipal election, losing to Rick Craven. In 2007, she ran as the Ontario Liberal Party candidate for Burlington, coming second to PC candidate Joyce Savoline by only 1824 votes, and receiving 37.81% of the vote. After 2007, Meed Ward returned to journalism, before deciding to run for election municipally. After moving to downtown Burlington (Ward 2), she ran for municipal council again in 2010, defeating incumbent Peter Thoem. She was re-elected in 2014, before running in 2018 for mayor, and defeating incumbent Rick Goldring.

Mayor of Burlington 
Meed Ward was up against two-term incumbent Rick Goldring and former Burlington MP, Mike Wallace. She campaigned on stopping overdevelopment in Burlington, specifically downtown. She had also campaigned on addressing traffic congestion, flood risk, protecting the city's tree canopy, tax reform and building trust between the community and council. Meed Ward won the 2018 municipal election with 23,360 votes and receiving 46.04% of the vote. In December 2018, the Ontario Provincial Police laid criminal charges against a third-party advertiser for alleged election spending violations in an advertising campaign targeting Meed Ward. By April 2022, all charges had been withdrawn.

In October 2022, Meed Ward was re-elected for a second term, winning 77.95% of the popular vote and receiving almost 25,000 more votes than the runner-up. She ran on a platform for reasonable development, adding more community centres and parks, and cutting red tape. Less than 28% of eligible voters participated in the 2022 election, down from almost 40% in the 2018 election.

Personal life 
Meed Ward currently resides in Burlington with her husband Peter and their three children.

References

External links 
 Burlington City Council

1966 births
Living people
American emigrants to Canada
Journalists from Ontario
Mayors of Burlington, Ontario
Ontario Liberal Party candidates in Ontario provincial elections
People from Greeley, Colorado
Women mayors of places in Ontario
Carleton University alumni